Sergey Melnikov (born 8 November 1968) is a retired Russian middle distance runner who specialized in the 1500 metres.

He finished tenth at the 1991 IAAF World Indoor Championships and won a silver medal at the 1992 European Indoor Championships. He competed at the 1991 World Championships, but only reached the semi-final.

References

External links 

1968 births
Living people
Soviet male middle-distance runners
Russian male middle-distance runners
Soviet Athletics Championships winners
Russian Athletics Championships winners